General elections were held in Northern Rhodesia on 29 August 1941. All five Labour Party candidates won their seats.

Electoral system
The eight elected members of the Legislative Council (an increase from seven in the 1938 elections) were elected from eight single-member constituencies. The additional seat was created by splitting Ndola into two to form the new constituency of Luanshya. The Northern Constituency was renamed Broken Hill and most of its area was transferred to the new North-Eastern constituency, which replaced Eastern. There were a total of 5,638 registered voters.

Results

Aftermath
Following the elections Stewart Gore-Browne was reappointed to the Legislative Council by the Governor as the member representing native interests.

See also
List of members of the Legislative Council of Northern Rhodesia (1941–44)

References

1941 in Northern Rhodesia
1941 elections in Africa
1941
1941
1941 elections in the British Empire